Groover is an English surname. Notable people with the surname include:

 Denmark Groover Jr. (1922–2001), American politician
 Jan Groover (1943–2012), American photographer
 John Groover, Jr., musician with the band The Futuristiks
 Wink Groover (1935–2010), American horse trainer

Notable places named after people with the surname include:
 Groover-Stewart Drug Company Building in Florida
 Hatcher-Groover-Schwartz House in Georgia

See also
 Grieve (surname)
 Grieves (surname)
 Graver (surname)
 Graves (surname)
 Greeves
 Grover (surname)
 Groves (surname)

English-language surnames